"Like a Hobo" is a 2009 song recorded by British singer-songwriter Charlie Winston. It was the lead single from his second album Hobo on which it appears as the second track. Released in April 2009, the song achieved great success in Belgium (Wallonia) where it was ranked since January thanks to downloads, and was a top ten hit for 15 weeks. In France, it debuted at number-one on 11 April and stayed for eleven weeks in the top five.

Track listings
 CD single – Promo
 "Like a Hobo" – 3:40

 Digital download
 "Like a Hobo" – 3:40

Charts

References

Charlie Winston songs
2009 debut singles
SNEP Top Singles number-one singles
2009 songs